John Baskerville (by 1517 – 23 September 1577), of Chanstone Court, Vowchurch and Eardisley, Herefordshire, was a Member of Parliament for Herefordshire in April 1554 and 1555.

References

1577 deaths
English MPs 1554–1555
Year of birth uncertain